Graham Neil Westley (born 4 March 1968) is an English former professional footballer and manager who was most recently manager of League Two club Stevenage.

Westley's playing career, spent mostly as a striker in non-League football, was curtailed due to injury whilst playing for Kingstonian. It was at Kingstonian that he started his managerial career, at the age of 28, managing them for five months, before spending a year in charge of Enfield. In 1999, Westley became manager of Farnborough Town, guiding them to the Football Conference in 2002. He left Farnborough the following season, to become manager of Stevenage. He took the club to within one game of promotion to the Football League, but left the club in 2006 when his contract expired. Westley then had a brief spell with Rushden & Diamonds, as well as acting as caretaker manager at Kettering Town.

He took a year out of the game, before rejoining Stevenage in May 2008. He managed the club to FA Trophy success in 2009, before securing promotion to the Football League for the first time in the club's history in April 2010, finishing the season as league champions. The club won back-to-back promotions in his first season as a Football League manager, following Stevenage's successful 2010–11 League Two play-off campaign. At the start of 2012, Westley left Stevenage to join Preston North End. He was sacked by the club in February 2013. A month later, Westley rejoined Stevenage, his third spell at the club. He managed the club for another two years, before leaving again in May 2015. He took charge at Peterborough United four months later, before being sacked shortly before the end of the 2015–16 season. He was appointed manager at Newport County in October 2016, with the club lying bottom of the Football League, and was sacked five months later. He was appointed as head coach of Barnet in January 2018, before managing Stevenage for a fourth time for two months from December 2019.

Playing career
Westley was born in Hounslow, London and he started his footballing career as an apprentice with Queens Park Rangers. During his time at QPR, Westley represented England at under-18 level. He then joined Gillingham in March 1986. He made two Third Division appearances for the club before joining Barnet. He made three appearances and scored one goal for them in the Football Conference during the 1987–88 season, making his debut for the club in a 2–2 draw against Macclesfield Town at Moss Rose. 

Westley joined Wycombe Wanderers in the latter stages of 1987 for a fee of £7,500, making a scoring debut in a 2–1 away victory at Telford United. He scored in Wycombe's next two games, and was a first team regular until manager Peter Suddaby left the club in January 1988. Westley played just once under new manager Jim Kelman and left soon afterwards to sign for Kingstonian. He played 24 times for Wycombe, scoring five goals in all competitions during the club's 1987–88 campaign. 

He later played for a number of non-League clubs, including Kingstonian, Wealdstone, Farnborough Town, Harlow Town, Enfield, Aylesbury United, Harrow Borough, Tooting & Mitcham United, Molesey and Walton & Hersham – three of which he would later go on to manage. He was voted Player of the Season at Enfield, before being swapped to Aylesbury in exchange for Darren Collins in December 1992. During his time at Kingstonian, he suffered a dislocated ankle and broken leg in three places, which subsequently cut his playing career short as he never fully recovered from the injury.

Managerial career

Early management
While recovering from a broken leg, at the age of 28, Westley was appointed as manager of Kingstonian in December 1996 after approaching the club about their vacant managerial post. His first two games as manager of the club both ended in 4–4 draws against Walton & Hersham and Harrow Borough, with Westley saying "at the time, there was something raw and exciting about the team that I sent out. Although there was also something evidently missing". His first victory as manager was a 2–0 victory over Wokingham Town in the Isthmian League Cup, before securing his first league win in the following game, a 5–2 win away at Aylesbury United. Kingstonian drew clear of relegation, with Westley recalling a 3–2 victory over champions Yeovil Town at Huish Park as a "memorable victory". Despite helping Kingstonian avoid relegation, he was sacked after five months, being replaced by Geoff Chapple. He managed Kingstonian for 25 games, recording nine wins, eight losses, and eight draws.

In September 1997, Westley was appointed as manager of another club he had previously played for in the form of Isthmian League Premier Division club Enfield. He appointed Graham Pearce as his assistant, who had also previously played for, and managed, Enfield. He outlined his ambition of ensuring the club returned to the top tier in non-League, despite the club struggling with financial difficulties, he stated "my ambition is to see silverware in the table, and if you can't take the pressure, you shouldn't take big jobs like this one". His first game as manager of Enfield was a 2–0 home defeat to St Albans City. Enfield finished in seventh place in Westley's first season there and he left the club after nine months in charge. He managed the club for 41 games; winning 19, losing 16, and drawing six, with a win percentage of 46.34%.

Farnborough Town
In 1999, Westley bought a controlling interest in Farnborough Town and appointed himself as manager. He managed the club to a 12th-place finish in his first season and enjoyed success in the Isthmian Cup; winning the competition in 2000. The following season, Farnborough won the Isthmian League Premier Division; securing 31 victories from 42 matches and amassing 99 points. Westley overhauled the squad shortly after the club's promotion to the Football Conference, which he later stated as a "huge regret". At this point, he also tried to arrange a merger with Kingstonian, citing the club's "Football League rated ground" as the reasoning behind his proposed idea, although it never happened due to "fans resistance". 

During the 2001–02 season, the club consolidated their position in the first tier of non-League football; finishing in seventh place in the league. The following season, Westley managed the club to the Third Round of the FA Cup after a 3–0 victory at Southport, where they faced Football League competition in the form of Darlington at Feethams. They won the match 3–2 and the club were rewarded with a Fourth Round tie at home to Arsenal. The match was moved to Highbury, Arsenal's home stadium, because the tie stood to make around £600,000 in gate receipts from playing at Highbury, whereas playing at Cherrywood Road would have generated the club an estimated £50,000. Westley left the club after the sell-out 'home' tie at Highbury, which they lost 5–1. Shortly after his resignation, he became manager at Football Conference club Stevenage Borough in January 2003, signing a three-year contract. Westley confirmed he would be leaving his shareholding in Farnborough to other existing shareholders, and would also be withdrawing his financial backing at the club. On moving to Stevenage, Westley said "I've enjoyed my time at Farnborough, but I feel that I need to move on now and that I need to concentrate on football management, which is where my ambitions lie". He also stated that Stevenage's "long-term potential" was another key factor behind the move.

Stevenage
When Westley took over the Hertfordshire club, Stevenage were positioned in 21st place in the Football Conference, and were six points adrift of safety. Unlike his position at his previous club, Westley was appointed as first team manager, with no board involvement. With an initial objective of keeping the club in the highest tier in non-League football, he signed seven players from his previous club Farnborough, as well as his former assistant Graham Pearce and goalkeeping coach Graham Benstead. His first game as manager of the club was a 1–1 draw at home to Morecambe on 13 February 2003, before waiting three games for his first win, a 2–0 victory away at local rivals Barnet on 8 March 2003. The victory served as the catalyst for an eight-game unbeaten run, recording six consecutive victories to ensure the club avoided relegation. Westley guided the club from 21st in the table to a 12th-place finish by the end of the season. Stevenage finished in eighth place during the 2003–04 season, Westley's first full season.

As was the case in previous seasons, Westley made wholesale changes at the end of the season, releasing several of the players he had originally signed from Farnborough, and replacing them with a mixture of players with Football League experience – in the form of Brian Quailey, Dannie Bulman, and Matt Hocking, as well as players from lower divisions such as Jon Nurse and Craig McAllister. Westley also gave first team opportunities to players who had progressed through the club's youth system, which included George Boyd. The new squad lost five games of the opening eight games of the club's league season. Following a 4–1 home defeat to  part-time Canvey Island, with Stevenage supporters calling for Westley to leave the club, he walked across the pitch to  the East Terrace and told supporters he "would turn it around". The team responded with four consecutive victories, and stayed close to the play-offs places. Stevenage went into the final day of the season needing to beat already-relegated Leigh RMI, and had to rely on Tamworth to hold Morecambe, who were currently occupying the final play-off spot. Stevenage beat Leigh 2–0, while Tamworth held Morecambe to a goalless draw, ultimately meaning Westley's team had reached the play-offs on the final day of the season. Stevenage overcame second-placed Hereford United 2–1 on aggregate, before losing 1–0 to Carlisle United at the Britannia Stadium in the final.

The 2005–06 season marked Westley's third season in charge as manager of the club, and although the club were consistent at Broadhall Way throughout the season, the team did not replicate this form away from home, winning four away games all season. Westley had also fallen out with the club's top goalscorer the previous season, striker Anthony Elding, was eventually sold to Kettering Town in January 2006. There were also question marks surrounding the discipline of the squad under Westley's control, as Stevenage received 14 red cards during the season, more than any other club in the league. A 2–0 defeat away to relegation-threatened Forest Green Rovers on the final day of the season meant that Stevenage failed to reach the play-offs, finishing sixth in the league table. After failing to reach the play-offs, Westley confirmed in May 2006 that he would leave the club when his contract expired in June, ending his three-and-a-half years with the Hertfordshire club.

Rushden & Diamonds
He was appointed manager of Conference National club Rushden & Diamonds in December 2006, with the club placed 22nd in the league table, two points adrift of safety. Westley's first game as manager of Rushden was a 1–0 victory away at Cambridge United on 26 December 2006. Westley signed several players who he had previously managed at Stevenage; signing Jamie Cook, David Perpetuini, and Dino Maamria. Westley also brought in Michael Bostwick and Chris Beardsley, younger players who he had previously written about in his weekly column in The Non-League Paper. The newly assembled team won five consecutive games in the league, including victories away at the top two teams in the league at the time, Oxford United and Dagenham & Redbridge. Despite managing an upturn in the form of the club, Westley was sacked after a 2–2 draw at Aldershot Town in February 2007. He had taken the club from 22nd in the league to 12th in the space of two-and-a-half months, and the club were on a seven-match unbeaten run at the time. Westley managed Rushden for thirteen games; winning seven, drawing three and losing three. No reasons were given as to why Westley left the club and he was replaced two days later by Garry Hill.

Kettering Town
Shortly after leaving Rushden, Westley was appointed caretaker manager of Conference North club Kettering Town for the rest of the 2006–07 season on 20 April 2007. Due to the date he joined, Westley was unable to bring any new players, with just two games remaining until the end of the season. His first game as manager was a 0–0 draw away to Stalybridge Celtic, shortly followed by a 1–0 defeat to Alfreton Town at Rockingham Road enough to ensure Kettering finished the season in second place. He managed Kettering in the play-offs, as they were beaten on penalties by Farsley Celtic in the semi-final after a 1–1 aggregate scoreline over two legs, he left shortly after when his short-term contract expired in May 2007, managing the club for four games.

Return to Stevenage

After almost a year without work in football, Westley returned as manager of Stevenage on 2 May 2008, two years after he had left. On his return, Westley stated he had come to "finish the job he started", referring to trying to guide the club into the Football League for the first time in its history. He said that "the moment was right" for him to come back into football and that he "had some very good times at Stevenage before". His appointment was met with scepticism by some Stevenage supporters, but Westley promised to deliver a winning team. Westley started by overhauling the squad in the summer transfer window and brought in 12 players. Among those brought in were Gary Mills and David Bridges, who Westley had managed during his time at Kettering. He also signed Michael Bostwick and Mark Albrighton, who he had also signed at Rushden & Diamonds. Westley also signed Andy Drury and Eddie Odhiambo respectively, both of whom were players Westley had previously earmarked.

Stevenage started the season poorly, losing three out of their first four games and conceding thirteen goals in the process, including a 5–0 defeat to Wrexham on the first day of the season. The club secured its first victory of the season on 30 August 2008, a 3–1 win away at Barrow, before winning four consecutive matches throughout September. Through the first half of the club's 2008–09 campaign, Westley's team were suffering from the same inconsistency that was common in his first spell as manager of the Hertfordshire club, losing three consecutive matches in November, the last of which was a 2–1 home defeat to Wrexham; it was to be Stevenage's last defeat at Broadhall Way in the league for 18 months. Westley brought in former player, Dino Maamria as first-team coach at the club. This, coupled with signings during the season, such as Chris Day, Mark Roberts, and Jon Ashton, meant that Stevenage improved during the second half of the season. A club record 24-game unbeaten run lasting from December 2008 to April 2009 meant that the club made the Conference Premier play-offs, finishing in the last play-off place. Despite taking a 3–1 lead into the second leg, Stevenage lost 4–3 on aggregate to Cambridge United. The club won the FA Trophy that season, beating York City 2–0 in the Final at Wembley Stadium. The FA Trophy success was Westley's first managerial honours won as manager of Stevenage. After the game, Westley signed a one-year contract extension.

The majority of the squad that performed well in the second half of the club's 2008–09 campaign were retained, with very little transfer activity in comparison to previous seasons under Westley. Steve Morison, the club's top goalscorer for the past three seasons, transferred to Millwall for a fee of £130,000, while both John Martin and Calum Willock were released by Westley in late May 2009. Midfielder Gary Mills was the last departure of the close season; rejecting a contract and instead opting to join fellow Conference Premier club Mansfield Town. Five players joined the club during the close season. Charlie Griffin was the first signing of the season, joining Stevenage from Salisbury City on a free transfer. Yemi Odubade, Chris Beardsley, and Joel Byrom signed for the club shortly after; the latter commanding a transfer fee of £15,000. Westley had previously managed Beardsley at Rushden & Diamonds and Kettering Town. The last signing of pre-season was Stacy Long; who joined the club on a free transfer from Ebbsfleet United. No players departed the club during the season, with Tim Sills the only addition, signing for an undisclosed fee from Torquay United in January 2010.

Stevenage started the 2009–10 season by recording one win from their first five games of the season. Following a 2–1 defeat to Oxford United in August 2009, the team went on a 17-game unbeaten run from August to December 2009, propelling the club into the top two. Unlike in previous seasons, the club were performing strongly away from home, and secured victories at promotion rivals Luton Town and Mansfield Town. A 4–1 victory against Cambridge United on New Year's Day meant that Stevenage were positioned in first place in the league table for the first time in the season. Two away defeats within the space of a week in February meant that rivals Oxford United had an eight–point lead going into March 2010. Stevenage responded by winning eight consecutive games; including a 1–0 victory over Oxford United in late March, subsequently replacing Oxford at the top of the table. 

Stevenage earned promotion to the Football League with two games to spare following a 2–0 win against Kidderminster Harriers at Aggborough on 17 April 2010. The team won their last six games of the league campaign without conceding a goal, and recorded 42 points from a possible 45 from their last 15 league fixtures. Stevenage finished the season having amassed 99 points from 44 games, winning the league by 11 points. The promotion meant Westley had led Stevenage to the Football League for the first time in their history, as well as managing a Football League team for the first time in his managerial career. Westley also guided the club to another FA Trophy Final; this time losing 2–1 after extra-time against Barrow at Wembley Stadium. At the end of the season, Westley signed a new two-year contract; keeping him contracted to the club until 2012. On signing the new deal, Westley said "I am grateful for all the support that we have all been given in the past two years. I am delighted to have the opportunity to manage the launch of the club into the Football League". In his first two seasons back at the club, from May 2008 to May 2010, Westley has been in charge for 114 games, winning a total of 70 games – recording a win percentage of 61.40%.

Similarly to the club's successful campaign the season before, but in complete contrast to his first spell at the club, the 2010–11 season saw five players joining the club, while five players left the club in the close season. The club started the season inconsistently, with Westley stating the season would be a "massive learning curve" for both himself and the players. Following four defeats in six games in December 2010 and January 2011, Stevenage found themselves in 18th position, just four points above the relegation zone. Throughout February and March 2011, Stevenage won nine games out of eleven, propelling the club up the league table and into the play-off positions. This included winning six games in a row, a sequence only matched by Bury that season. A 3–3 draw against Bury on the final day of the season meant that Stevenage finished the season in sixth place. They faced fifth-placed Accrington Stanley in the 2010–11 League Two play-off semi-finals, winning both legs by a 3–0 aggregate scoreline. They beat Torquay United 1–0 in the Final at Old Trafford on 28 May 2011. The victory meant that Westley had guided the club to back-to-back promotions, playing in League One for the first time in the club's history. On securing promotion, Westley said "It's a fantastic feeling. The players work so hard and they deserve everything they get". During the 2010–11 season, Westley also guided the club to the Fourth Round of the FA Cup, where they lost to Reading 2–1. In the previous round, Stevenage beat Premier League club Newcastle United 3–1 at Broadhall Way. After the match, Westley said before the game he had told the players to "go out and win the match 5–0. We established that if we did just 20% of what it would take to win 5–0 then we would still win the game".

At the start of the 2011–12 season, Westley signed a three-year contract extension at Stevenage that kept him contracted to the club until 2014. Westley acquired five players on free transfers, while also releasing five of the existing squad. Stevenage started their first ever League One campaign well, beating the 2010–11 League One play-off semi-finalists, AFC Bournemouth, 3–1 at Dean Court to secure their first victory of the season on 16 August 2011. Stevenage were exceeding expectations in the third tier of English football, sitting just outside the play-off places after securing a notable 5–1 victory against Sheffield Wednesday at Broadhall Way in September 2011. The club also inflicted Charlton Athletic's first league defeat of the season after a 1–0 win against the league leaders. The victory against Charlton was to spark a 13-game unbeaten run for the team, and a 6–1 away victory at Colchester United on Boxing Day 2011 meant the club were in sixth place, the final play-off position. After managing Stevenage for three-and-a-half years, Westley left Stevenage in January 2012, joining fellow League One club Preston North End. His final game as manager of Stevenage was a 1–0 away victory at Reading in the FA Cup Third Round.

Preston North End
In January 2012, Preston North End asked for permission to speak to Westley with the view to employing him as their new manager. Though the Hertfordshire club described the approach as "unwelcome", permission was granted. After personal terms and a compensation package were agreed, Westley was appointed as Preston's new manager on 13 January 2012. His first game in charge of the club was a 2–0 home defeat against Leyton Orient on 21 January 2012. He picked up his first win as Preston manager in his fourth game in charge, securing a 1–0 home victory over Hartlepool United on 14 February 2012. Following Preston's 2–0 televised defeat to Sheffield Wednesday on 31 March 2012, Westley stated that a Sheffield Wednesday player had informed him that four Preston players had leaked the Preston team and tactics to opposition players ahead of the match. Westley stated "It doesn't surprise me. When you have got people in your own camp working against you it is tough". Preston won two games out of the next 17 during the remainder of the campaign, and finished the season in 15th place. At the end of the season, Westley criticised the club's "mediocre" mentality, stating the squad have "not got a clue what it takes to get success".

Westley subsequently went about overhauling the squad ahead of the 2012–13 season. In May 2012, Preston announced that 21 players would be leaving the club; 14 of which were released at the end of their contracts, while a further seven were transfer-listed. Preston signed 18 players during the summer transfer window, including Scott Laird, John Mousinho, Joel Byrom, and Chris Beardsley, four players from Westley's former club, Stevenage. Westley stated a desire for the new group of players to be committed to his ideas – "My job is to develop a plan that would see the club back on an upward curve. The plan is in place. I'm looking forward to working with a group that thinks along the same lines that I do". Preston started the season by beating Championship club Huddersfield Town 2–0 at Deepdale in the League Cup. Later on in the month, Preston went on to secure consecutive 4–1 home victories, beating Crystal Palace and Swindon Town respectively, as well as defeating Hartlepool United 5–0 a month later. After this, the club went on to win two leagues matches in a four-month period from October 2012 to February 2013. A day after Preston's 3–1 away defeat to Yeovil Town on 12 February 2013, the club released a statement announcing Westley had been sacked. With Preston sitting just five points above the relegation zone, "the board felt that a change of manager was the only way forward". On his time at Preston, Westley stated he had to "slash the wage bill by 60 percent", and as a result the "re-building was well underway but the club lost confidence in me whilst I was doing it. They just want results. Short-term pain is necessary sometimes. It was necessary at Preston. And the fans got restless. I get that. Just as managers have to be brave enough to grit their teeth and face up to that, so owners have to be brave at difficult times. And they have to be able to understand the issues. I knew the answers to problems but I wasn't being allowed to solve all the problems".

Third spell at Stevenage
After a month out of work, Westley rejoined Stevenage on 30 March 2013, his third spell in charge at the club. On the appointment, Stevenage chairman Phil Wallace stated – "Graham was keen to come back to Stevenage and, although I met some strong candidates, without doubt I think he's the best man for the job right now. The club enjoyed a great deal of success before he left last year and we moved forwards significantly in his time here on several levels". On his return, Westley stated "I'm really happy to be back, the training ground is fantastic, the club just keeps moving forward. All the facilities keep improving and I hope that I can come back and make another positive difference". In his first game back in charge of the club, Stevenage secured a 1–0 victory over Hartlepool United on 1 April 2013. Stevenage ended the 2012–13 season in 18th place, and Westley released four players and transfer-listed three others.

He signed seven players in preparation for the 2013–14 season, and further strengthened by signing striker François Zoko in September. However, Stevenage never recovered from a poor start to the season, and despite a late run of six undefeated games ended the campaign in last-place and were therefore relegated into League Two, finishing eight points shy of safety. Westley responded by releasing nine players, whilst a further four were sold on.

Westley was forced to largely rebuild the squad for the 2014–15 season, and brought in 15 new signings, including Dean Wells, Calvin Zola, and Charlie Lee. He guided the team to a play-off place with a sixth-place finish, before they were beaten by Southend United 4–2 on aggregate in the semi-finals after conceding two goals in extra-time of the second leg fixture at Roots Hall. On 21 May 2015, Westley was replaced as manager by ex-England striker Teddy Sheringham.

Peterborough United
In September 2015, Westley was appointed manager of League One club Peterborough United. He was named as League One Manager of the Month for November 2015 after his team secured 12 points and 14 goals from four league games, which earned him praise for his side's open, attacking play. Despite lifting the "Posh" into the play-off places in January, a very poor run of form saw Peterborough slide down the table and Westley was sacked by Peterborough on 23 April after a 2–0 defeat to Scunthorpe United at London Road left them 14th in the League One table.

Newport County
Westley was appointed manager of League Two bottom side Newport County on 7 October 2016, following the sacking of Warren Feeney. Despite Westley criticising his players with some "harsh words", saying he was "not prepared to tolerate that sort of rubbish anymore", Newport went on to lose eight successive games, which Westley described as "embarrassing" and "humiliating". Club secretary Graham Bean resigned in December, saying "Graham Westley is an impossible man to work with... he needs to learn some manners and start treating people with some respect". Shortly afterwards Westley again courted controversy after refusing to leave opposition manager Derek Adams's press conference. He signed 14 players in the January transfer window, a move he admitted was a "short-term risk". However, he failed to arrest the team's declining fortunes and was sacked on 9 March 2017 with Newport 11 points adrift at the bottom of League Two. The club's board said that they had consulted both fans and the players over their decision to sack Westley; he had been confronted by irate supporters at Rodney Parade and after his sacking transfer-listed midfielder Mark Randall came out to say he had been "treated quite unfairly" by Westley. Caretaker-manager Michael Flynn managed to organise an unlikely escape from relegation for the "Exiles" after overseeing seven victories in the remaining 12 games of the 2016–17 season.

Westley maintained that his strategy had played a key part in Newport's survival, stating "If you go back to the AGM just after the turn of the year, Newport were rooted to the bottom of the Football League and I was very clear there was one way out of it – turning the whole squad over in January. I put together a team to function on the bog of a pitch that was Rodney Parade and my strategy is what kept that club in the Football League. Yes, it happened under Flynny's management but I think anyone who is honest would say I did a very good job in working out a way of surviving and building a squad that would win the games at home to keep them in the League".

Barnet
Westley was appointed as head coach of League Two club Barnet on 15 January 2018. Barnet chairman Anthony Kleanthous stated the move had come about after Westley had been recommended to him by Peterborough United director of football, Barry Fry. Despite his previous ties with local rivals Stevenage, Westley had been identified as a "high impact manager" capable of changing Barnet's fortunes, with the club sitting bottom of League Two at the time of his appointment. He joined Barnet on a rolling contract. Westley's first game in charge was a 1–1 draw with promotion-chasing Lincoln City on 20 January 2018. He was sacked by Barnet on 19 March 2018, just two months into his time there, and was immediately replaced with Martin Allen. Barnet had won two games out of eleven with Westley in charge, drawing four and losing five.

Fourth spell at Stevenage
On 15 December 2019 Westley's return to Stevenage as manager was announced, four-and-a-half years after his last spell ended and taking over from caretaker manager Mark Sampson who reverted to first team coach. Westley returned with the club 23rd in EFL League Two, signing a contract until the end of the 2019–20 season. On 21 December 2019 Sampson completed his final match in charge of the club, losing 5–1 at home to Crewe Alexandra. Westley started his role two days later but won just one and drew three of the next 13 league matches, despite signing nine players in the January 2020 transfer window. Westley resigned as manager on 16 February 2020 with Stevenage in 24th place and seven points adrift at the bottom of League Two, having lost all six of his final matches in charge. Stevenage youth team manager Alex Revell replaced Westley as team manager until the end of the 2019–20 season.

Personal life
Westley wrote a weekly column in The Non-League Paper, sharing his views and experiences on the non-League game. He is the chief executive of the Aimita Corporation, an organisation that provides performance management consulting. Westley has also gained a Master of Arts degree in company direction.

Statistics

Playing statistics
Source:

Managerial statistics

Honours

Farnborough Town
Isthmian League Cup: 2000–01
Isthmian League Premier Division: 2000–01

Stevenage
FA Trophy: 2008–09; runner-up: 2009–10
Conference Premier: 2009–10
League Two play-offs: 2010–11

Individual
 Conference Premier Manager of the Month: October 2005, January 2009, January 2010
 League One Manager of the Month: November 2015

References

1968 births
Living people
Footballers from Hounslow
English footballers
England youth international footballers
Association football forwards
Queens Park Rangers F.C. players
Gillingham F.C. players
Barnet F.C. players
Wycombe Wanderers F.C. players
Kingstonian F.C. players
Wealdstone F.C. players
Farnborough F.C. players
Harlow Town F.C. players
Enfield F.C. players
Aylesbury United F.C. players
Harrow Borough F.C. players
Tooting & Mitcham United F.C. players
Molesey F.C. players
Walton & Hersham F.C. players
English Football League players
National League (English football) players
Isthmian League players
Southern Football League players
English football managers
Kingstonian F.C. managers
Enfield F.C. managers
Farnborough F.C. managers
Stevenage F.C. managers
Rushden & Diamonds F.C. managers
Kettering Town F.C. managers
Preston North End F.C. managers
Peterborough United F.C. managers
Newport County A.F.C. managers
Barnet F.C. managers
Isthmian League managers
National League (English football) managers
English Football League managers
English columnists